The Cairo Trilogy ( ath-thulathia ('The Trilogy') or  thulathia al-Qahra) is a trilogy of novels written by the Egyptian novelist and Nobel Prize winner Naguib Mahfouz, and one of the prime works of his literary career.

The three novels are Palace Walk (Bayn al-Qasrayn), first Arabic publication 1956; Palace of Desire (Qasr al-Shawq), 1957; and Sugar Street (Al-Sukkariyya), 1957.

Titles
The three novels' Arabic titles are taken from the names of actual streets in Cairo, the city of Mahfouz's childhood and youth. The first novel, Bayn al-Qasrayn,  is named after the medieval Cairo street in the Gamaliya district where the strict socially conservative protagonist, Ahmad 'Abd al-Jawad, and his family live. The second novel, Qasr al-Shawq, is named after the street where his eldest son Yasin and his family live, and the third, Al-Sukkariyya, is named after the street where his daughter Khadijah and her family live.

Narrative
The trilogy follows the life of the Cairene patriarch Al-Sayyid (Mr.) Ahmad 'Abd al-Jawad and his family across three generations, from 1919 – the year of Egyptian Revolution against the British colonizers ruling Egypt – to almost the end of the Second World War in 1944. The three novels represent three eras of Cairene socio-political life, a microcosm of early 20th century Egypt, through the life of one well-off Cairo merchant, his children and his grandchildren.

To Kamal, 'Abd al-Jawad's youngest son, Mahfouz admits that he gives him some features of himself, as they both got a BA in philosophy from what is now the University of Cairo and have problems with profound contradictions they discern between religious principles and the scientific discoveries of the West.

Seen as a child in the first novel, a university student in the second, and a teacher, not married, in the third, Kamal loses his faith in religion, in love, and in traditions and lives in the second and third novels as an outsider in his own society. He keeps searching for meaning of his life until the last scene, in which Kamal's attitude to life changes to the positive as he starts to see himself as 'idealistic' teacher, future husband and revolutionary man.

Mahfouz sees the development of society as an important influence on the role of women. He represents the traditional, obedient women who do not go to school such as Amina, 'Abd al-Jawad's wife, and her daughters in the first novel; women as students in the university such as Aida, Kamal's beloved, in the second novel; and women as students in the university, members of the Marxist party and editors of the journal of the party in the third novel.

Throughout the trilogy, Mahfouz develops his theme: social progress will be the inevitable result of the evolutionary spirit of humankind. Time is the major leitmotif in all three books, and its passage is marked in literal and symbolic ways, from the daily pounding of bread dough in the morning, which serves as an alarm clock for the family, to the hourly calls for prayers that ring out from the minarets of Cairo.  In the first novel time moves slowly; this story belongs to Kamal, still a child. The permanence of childhood is pronounced, and the minutes often tick by like hours.  And yet inevitable changes occur: sisters get married, babies are born, grandparents die, life goes on.  The passage of time quickens in the following book, and doubles yet again in the third.  By the time the trilogy concludes whole years seem to fly by to the middle-aged Kamal.

Critical comments and reactions  
Mahfouz' concern with the nature of time was influenced by the French philosopher Henri Bergson, whom Mahfouz studied as an undergraduate. He was also impressed by the concern with time in Marcel Proust's Remembrance of Things Past, Proust being another of Bergson's admirers. Bergson's philosophy holds that one needs to make a distinction between psychological time and real, physical time; psychological time is apprehended through intuition, whereas real time is apprehended through the intellect. "Supreme" moments in time Bergson called Duration, and these are the moments when we really live. In the Cairo Trilogy, this idea is both frequent and organic, dramatizing Bergson's philosophical theories on the nature of time and evoking the most fundamental of human concerns which is the purpose of our existence.

Translations

The Cairo Trilogy was first translated into Hebrew between 1981 and 1987. Mahfouz was very satisfied by this and saw it as another proof that the Israeli-Egyptian peace treaty of 1979 should be supported. The English translation was published by Doubleday in the early 1990s. The translators were:
 Palace Walk - William M. Hutchins and Olive Kenny
 Palace of Desire - Hutchins, Olive Kenny and Lorne Kenny
 Sugar Street - Hutchins, Olive Kenny and Angele Botros Samaan

The translation was overseen by Jacqueline Kennedy Onassis, an editor at Doubleday at the time, and Martha Levin.

References

External links 

  

Novels by Naguib Mahfouz
1956 novels
Literary trilogies
Novel series
Novels set in Cairo
Egyptian novels